is a 2000 anime OVA based on characters created by Leiji Matsumoto about how the planet La Maetelle becomes the planet Andromeda, also known as Planet Maetel ("the mechanized world"). It serves a link between Matsumoto's previous series Queen Millennia and Galaxy Express 999. Space Symphony Maetel. The OVA and series are supposed to follow Queen Millennia chronologically, and are prequels to Galaxy Express 999.

Plot

Cast

External links
Central Media's Site